Frank E. Evans may refer to:
 Frank Evans (general) (Frank Edgar Evans, 1876–1941), United States Marine Corps general
USS Frank E. Evans, a 1944 destroyer named after the general
 Frank Evans (politician) (Frank Edward Evans, 1923–2010), U.S. Representative from Colorado

See also 
 Frank Evans (disambiguation)

Evans, Frank